Oladele Brendon Ayanbadejo (born September 6, 1976) is a former American football linebacker and special teamer who played in Canadian Football League (CFL) and the National Football League (NFL) for thirteen seasons.  He played college football for the University of California, Los Angeles (UCLA).  He was signed by the Atlanta Falcons as an undrafted free agent in 1999.

Ayanbadejo has been selected to the Pro Bowl three times as a special teams player. He also was named to the All-Pro team two times as special teams player by Pro Football Weekly/Pro Football Writers Association. He has also been a member of the Chicago Bears and Miami Dolphins of the NFL, the Amsterdam Admirals of NFL Europe, and the Winnipeg Blue Bombers, Toronto Argonauts, and BC Lions of the CFL.

Early years
Ayanbadejo was born in Chicago to a Nigerian father and an American mother of Irish descent. His name "Oladele" is the Yoruba translation for "Wealth comes home." He has one older brother, Obafemi Ayanbadejo, also a professional football player. Shortly after his birth the family moved to Nigeria, but after his parents separated he returned to the United States with his mother, settling in Chicago and then Santa Cruz, California. He attended Santa Cruz High School, where he played as a tight end.

College career
For college Ayanbadejo enrolled at the University of California, Los Angeles, where he played college football for the UCLA Bruins. He was first-team all-Pac-10 his senior season with four sacks against arch-rival USC's Carson Palmer. He majored in history. Ayanbadejo was one of 15 players on UCLA's late 1990s teams involved in the handicapped parking placard scandal.

Professional career

Early career
Ayanbadejo was originally signed by the Atlanta Falcons of the National Football League as an undrafted free agent on April 23, 1999. He served on the practice squad of the Falcons and the Chicago Bears before being picked up by the Winnipeg Blue Bombers of the Canadian Football League in 2000, and spent time with them and the Toronto Argonauts. He played the 2001 season with the Amsterdam Admirals of NFL Europe, and played for the BC Lions of the CFL in 2002. For September 2002, the CFL named Ayanbadejo the Defensive Player of the Month for recording two interceptions, six special team tackles, 21 defensive tackles, one pass deflected, and two recovered fumbles.

Miami Dolphins
In 2003, he returned to the NFL as a member of the Miami Dolphins. In 2004, Ayanbadejo made a play that led to one of the biggest upset comebacks in Monday Night Football history.  While getting sacked, New England Patriots quarterback Tom Brady threw the ball up for grabs.  Ayanbadejo caught it for the interception, and the Dolphins went on to win the game by one point.

Chicago Bears
During the 2005 offseason, Ayanbadejo was traded to the Chicago Bears. Ayanbadejo was selected to consecutive Pro Bowls as a special teamer in 2006 and 2007.

Baltimore Ravens (second stint)
On March 6, 2008, Ayanbadejo signed a four-year, $4.9 million contract with the Baltimore Ravens.  The contract included a $1.9 million signing bonus. He again made the Pro Bowl that season for his special teams contributions. In 2009, Ayanbadejo began to contribute more on the Ravens defense. In week three against the Cleveland Browns, Ayanbadejo recorded six tackles, one of which was for a loss, a sack, and an interception. For his effort, he was awarded AFC Defensive Player of the Week (Week 3). In week 4 against the Patriots, Brendon tore a quadriceps muscle. He said after the game he could miss the rest of the year and was placed on the Injured Reserve list two days later.

On October 24, 2011, Ayanbadejo was ejected from a game for striking Jacksonville Jaguars offensive lineman Guy Whimper in the face.

In 2013, Ayanbadejo helped the Ravens defeat Indianapolis and Denver in the playoffs, and move on to defeat the New England Patriots in the AFC Championship game. The Ravens' season culminated in New Orleans on February 3, 2013, when they defeated the San Francisco 49ers 34-31 in Super Bowl XLVII, becoming two-time Super Bowl champions.  He never started a single game for the Ravens during the 2012 season, spending most of his time on special teams.

Ayanbadejo was released by the Ravens on April 3, 2013.

NFL statistics

Broadcasting
In August 2013 Ayanbadejo was hired by Fox Sports as an analyst for Fox Football Daily on Fox Sports 1. He also serves as an occasional game analyst on NFL on Fox coverage.

LGBT rights advocacy

In 2009, Ayanbedejo began advocating for the legalization of same-sex marriage. His advocacy rather suddenly became a cause célèbre in September 2012, after Maryland State Delegate Emmett C. Burns Jr. wrote an August 29, 2012, letter to Baltimore Ravens owner Steve Bisciotti, on official Maryland State letterhead, demanding that Bisciotti "take the necessary action ... to inhibit such expressions from your employee." Burns' letter went on to state that, "I know of no other NFL player who has done what Mr. Ayanbadejo is doing." Burns' letter was widely criticized as an effort to infringe on Ayanbadejo's right to free speech. According to The Washington Post, the Ravens acknowledged receiving the letter but had no further comment.
Shortly after the Burns letter was delivered, Ayanbedejo publicly announced that, as the son of interracial parents whose own marriage would have been illegal in 16 states prior to the U.S. Supreme Court's landmark Loving v. Virginia decision in 1967, he had no intention of remaining silent on an issue of conscience and public importance. Ayanbadejo has since said that he has received widespread support in the world of football.
Among others, Minnesota Vikings punter Chris Kluwe wrote a scathing response to Burns, while the Ravens also publicly sided with Ayanbadejo. In February 2013, Ayanbadejo and Kluwe filed a joint amicus brief with the Supreme Court in support of same-sex marriage, particularly in the case dealing with California Proposition 8.

Personal life
He is the younger brother of former fullback Obafemi Ayanbadejo. The two were teammates on the Miami Dolphins in 2003. They were on the same team again in 2007, this time the Chicago Bears. Obafemi Ayanbadejo was cut by the Chicago Bears on October 1, 2007, after the fullback finished serving his four-game suspension for violating the NFL Policy on Anabolic Steroids and Related Substances.

Ayanbadejo wrote for the Santa Cruz Sentinel his first several years in the NFL. He has advocated for the passage of the FIT Kids Act, federal legislation that would require school districts to report on students' physical activity and to give youngsters health and nutritional information.

Ayenbadejo received his Executive MBA from The George Washington University in 2013.

He is married. His daughter, Anaya Lee Ayanbadejo, was born in August 2005; and his son, Amadeus Prime Ayanbadejo, was born in April 2011.

See also
Homosexuality in American football

References

External links

Just Sports Stats
Brendon Ayanbadejo's Official Website
Baltimore Ravens bio

1976 births
Living people
Players of American football from Chicago
Sportspeople from Santa Cruz, California
American sportspeople of Nigerian descent
American people of Irish descent
American people of Yoruba descent
American football linebackers
UCLA Bruins football players
Canadian football linebackers
American players of Canadian football
Atlanta Falcons players
Chicago Bears players
Winnipeg Blue Bombers players
Toronto Argonauts players
Los Angeles Xtreme players
Baltimore Ravens players
Amsterdam Admirals players
BC Lions players
Miami Dolphins players
National Conference Pro Bowl players
Yoruba sportspeople
Players of American football from California
American LGBT rights activists
National Football League announcers
Activists from California
Cabrillo Seahawks football players
Santa Cruz High School alumni
Players of Canadian football from California
Players of Canadian football from Chicago